New York Rugby League Football Club is an upcoming rugby league football club in the North American Rugby League.

History
It was first reported in October 2017 that a New York consortium were seeking to join the Rugby Football League's League 1 in 2019. Earlier in 2017, Canadian side Toronto Wolfpack became the first transatlantic team to join the league.

On May 20, 2019, the Rugby Football League released a statement on the two prospective overseas clubs. Ottawa had been accepted in principle to join League 1 in 2020 while New York had a change in ownership structure and was encouraged to work toward entry in 2021 instead. 

In March 2020, it was confirmed that the Ottawa Aces would be accepted for entry to RFL League 1 for the 2021 season, it was decided that adding 2 North American teams to a semi professional league would add extra pressure to current teams. So New York City Rugby League was planned to enter into the RFL League 1 for the 2022 season. Due to the COVID-19 pandemic, the Ottawa Aces inclusion into the RFL League 1 was delayed until 2022, it is now likely that a New York addition will be further postponed for the time being.

In April 2021, the clubs social media accounts were handed over to New York Freedom, a new franchise that was to be a founder member of the North American Rugby League. However in November 2021, the Freedom announced on their website that they would not be taking part in the NARL.

The original New York City Rugby League RFL bid team is now to join the NARL as a foundation club alongside Atlanta Rhinos, Cleveland, Toronto Wolfpack and Washington D.C. Cavalry.

Players

See also
United States national rugby league team
USA Rugby League
Rugby league in the United States

References

External links

2017 establishments in New York (state)
American rugby league teams
New York Freedom Rugby League
Proposed sports teams
Rugby clubs established in 2017
Rugby league teams in New York (state)